Victor Aitken (23 May 1887 – 31 October 1962) was an Australian long-distance runner. He competed in the men's marathon at the 1908 Summer Olympics. He was a non-smoker and teetotaller.

Aitken's first notable achievement in athletics was when he came second in the 1905 one-mile walking championship of Victoria and he also came second in the 1907 5-mile championship of Victoria in Ballarat. He them came first in the 7-mile open handicap at Heidelberg and the 10-mile championship of Victoria breaking the record by completing it in 59 minutes and 5 seconds.

In 1908 Aitken was selected as a Marathon representative for the Olympic Games in London and he ran twenty-two and a half miles before retiring due to "sleepiness". A week after arriving home from the Olympics he came sixth in the 10-mile championship. In 1909 he achieved record times in his three and five-mile club races and he broke his own record in the 10-mile championship of Victoria by 19 seconds.

References

External links

1887 births
1962 deaths
Athletes (track and field) at the 1908 Summer Olympics
Australian male long-distance runners
Australian male marathon runners
Olympic athletes of Australasia
People from Coburg, Victoria
Athletes from Melbourne
20th-century Australian people